Samuel Jennings (26 December 1898 – 21 August 1944) was an English footballer and football manager. A tall player, he was a goal-scoring centre-forward, with a ratio of a goal every two games.

After playing for various amateur sides, he joined Norwich City in 1919, moving on to Middlesbrough the following year. In 1921 he signed with Reading, where he would make his name over a three-year stay with 45 goals in 110 league games. After a season with West Ham United, he signed with Brighton & Hove Albion in 1925. Again prolific, he scored 61 goals in 110 games, and won a transfer to Nottingham Forest in 1928. Moving on to Port Vale in 1929, he bagged 42 goals in 63 league games. In the 1930s he enjoyed short spells at Stockport County and Burnley, before settling in France with Olympique de Marseille and Club Français. He later returned to England to turn out for non-league sides Scarborough and Wisbech Town.

After retiring as a player he took charge at Glentoran in 1936, before taking charge of Rochdale the following year. He also served as a coach across France and England.

Playing career
Jennings played for Highbury Vale Methodists, Basford United, 5th Reserve Battalion Coldstream Guards, and Basford National Ordnance Factory, before joining Norwich City in 1919. The "Canaries" finished 12th in the Southern League in 1919–20. He then moved on to Middlesbrough, and scored twice in ten First Division appearances in 1920–21. Jennings then signed with Reading, who went on to finish the 1921–22 campaign 13th in the Third Division South. The "Royals" then dropped to 19th and 18th in 1922–23 and 1923–24. In his three years at Elm Park he scored 45 goals in 110 league games.

He returned to the top-flight with West Ham United, but was limited to three goals in nine games in 1924–25. He quickly returned to the Third Division South with Brighton & Hove Albion, who posted a fifth-place finish in 1925–26. He finished as the club's top scorer in 1926–27 and 1927–28 with 20 and 27 goals respectively, as the "Seagulls" finished in fourth position. He spent 1928–29 with Nottingham Forest, and was the club's top scorer in 1928–29 with 17 goals in league and cup competitions.

He joined Port Vale in May 1929 and scored twice on his debut, in a 2–1 win over Halifax Town at The Shay. He built up a successful partnership with Albert Pynegar despite the pair falling out off the pitch. He bagged a hat-trick in a 3–0 win over South Shields at The Old Recreation Ground on 8 March 1930. He finished as the club's top scorer for the 1929–30 season with 27 goals in just 33 games, helping the club to the Third Division North title. He scored four goals in an 8–2 thrashing of Bradford Park Avenue on 22 September 1930, and ended up with 17 goals in 32 games in 1930–31 to become club's leading marksman for a second successive campaign. He hit two goals on the opening day of the 1931–32 season, in a 3–1 win over Plymouth Argyle at Home Park. He would train by throwing the ball up the pitch and race his greyhound to where it landed.

He was transferred to Third Division North side Stockport County in September 1931, later returning to the Second Division with Burnley in 1931–32. He then travelled to France for the first ever season of the Ligue de Football Professionnel. He scored four goals in 14 games, as Marseilles finished second behind Olympique Lillois. Jennings moved on to Club Français of Ligue 2, before returning to England to play for Scarborough and Wisbech Town.

Coaching and management career
Jennings became an instructor at Olympique de Marseille during his time at the club. He later became secretary-coach at Wisbech Town and a coach at Glentoran. He was also manager of Rochdale, and led the club to a 17th-place finish in the Third Division North in 1937–38.

World War II
He fought in World War II. He died at Darvel Hall in Robertsbridge on 21 August 1944 – he had two bouts of pneumonia which made him prone to chills – and was buried at Hastings crematorium eight days later.

Career statistics

Playing statistics
Source:

Managerial statistics

Honours
Port Vale
Football League Third Division North: 1929–30

See also
 List of footballers killed during World War II

References

1898 births
1944 deaths
People from Nottingham (district)
Footballers from Nottinghamshire
People from Robertsbridge
English footballers
Association football forwards
Norwich City F.C. players
Middlesbrough F.C. players
Reading F.C. players
West Ham United F.C. players
Brighton & Hove Albion F.C. players
Nottingham Forest F.C. players
Notts County F.C. wartime guest players
Port Vale F.C. players
Stockport County F.C. players
Burnley F.C. players
English expatriate footballers
Expatriate footballers in France
Olympique de Marseille players
Club Français players
Scarborough F.C. players
Wisbech Town F.C. players
Southern Football League players
English Football League players
Ligue 1 players
Association football coaches
English football managers
Glentoran F.C. managers
Rochdale A.F.C. managers
English Football League managers
Deaths from pneumonia in England
British military personnel of World War II